The Recreation Ground is a cricket ground in Kington, Herefordshire.  The first recorded match on the ground was in 1996, when Herefordshire played Wales Minor Counties in the grounds first Minor Counties Championship match.  From 1996 to present, the ground has hosted 6 Minor Counties Championship matches and 3 MCCA Knockout Trophy matches.

The ground also hosted a single List-A match in 1999, when Herefordshire played Yorkshire in the NatWest Trophy.

In local domestic cricket, The Recreation Ground is the home ground of Kington Cricket Club.

References

External links
The Recreation Ground on CricketArchive
The Recreation Ground on Cricinfo

Cricket grounds in Herefordshire
Sports venues completed in 1996
Herefordshire County Cricket Club